The Europe/Africa Zone is one of three zones of regional competition in the 2019 Fed Cup.

Group I 
Venue 1: Hala Widowiskowo-Sportowa, Zielona Góra, Poland (indoor hard)  Venue 2: University of Bath, Bath, United Kingdom (indoor hard)

Dates: 6–9 February

The fifteen teams were divided into three pools of four teams and one pool of three teams. The four pool winners took part in promotion play-offs to determine the two nations advancing to the World Group II play-offs. The nations finishing last in their pools took part in relegation play-offs, with the two losing nations being relegated to Group II for 2020. One nation was promoted and one nation was relegated from each venue.

Seeding

 1Fed Cup Rankings as of 12 November 2018

Pools

Play-offs

Final placements 

Group II 
Venue: Centre National de Tennis, Esch-sur-Alzette, Luxembourg (indoor hard)

Dates: 6–9 February

The seven teams were divided into two pools of three and four teams. The two pool winners and runners-up took part in promotion play-offs to determine the two nations advancing to the Group I for 2020. The nations finishing third in their pools took part in a relegation play-off, with the losing nation being relegated to Group III for 2020. The nation finishing last in Group B was automatically relegated to Group III for 2020.

Seeding

 1Fed Cup Rankings as of 12 November 2018

Pools

Play-offs

Final placements 

Group III 
Venue 1: Tali Tennis Center, Helsinki, Finland (indoor hard)  Venue 2: Ulcinj Bellevue, Ulcinj, Montenegro (clay)

Dates: 15–20 April

Format: 17 nations will compete across two different venues, with 9 nations taking part in Helsinki and 8 nations taking part in Ulcinj. In each location teams will compete across two pools; one pool of 5 teams and one pool of 4 teams in Helsinki, and one pool of 4 teams and one pool of 3 teams in Ulcinj. The winners of each pool will play-off to determine the nations advancing to Group II in 2020. One nation will be promoted from each venue.

Seeding

 1Fed Cup Rankings as of 11 February 2019

Pools

Play-offs

Final placements 

References 

 Fed Cup Result, 2019 Europe/Africa Group I
 Fed Cup Result, 2019 Europe/Africa Group II
 Fed Cup Result, 2019 Europe/Africa Group III

External links 
 Fed Cup website

 
Europe Africa
Tennis tournaments in England
Tennis tournaments in Poland
Tennis tournaments in Luxembourg
Tennis tournaments in Finland
Tennis tournaments in Montenegro
Fed Cup Europe Africa Zone
Fed Cup Europe Africa Zone
Fed Cup Europe Africa Zone
2019 in English tennis